David Philip Tuttle (born 6 February 1972 in Mortimer Common, Berkshire) is an English former footballer. He is currently manager of AFC Aldermaston.

Career
As a player, Tuttle was a central defender. He began his playing career at Tottenham Hotspur, where he scored his first professional goal in the 1991–92 European Cup Winners' Cup against Hajduk Split. He subsequently had spells with Sheffield United, Crystal Palace, Barnsley and Millwall.

Tuttle became assistant manager to Colin Lee at Millwall and was later appointed manager of Millwall in December 2005 with the target of saving the club from relegation to League One. After failing in his task he left two games before the end of the 2005–06 season.

Tuttle later moved to Swindon Town to run their youth set-up and scouting, linking up with former Millwall teammate Dennis Wise. When Wise left to manage Leeds United in October 2006 Tuttle briefly became caretaker manager but the left the job just 24 hours later. He later left Swindon after Paul Sturrock was appointed. Tuttle joined Dorking in an advisory capacity in June 2007, also signing for the club as a player, though a few weeks later he was appointed chief scout of Milton Keynes Dons.

On 27 August 2009, Tuttle was confirmed as the new manager of struggling Southern League Division One South and West side Bracknell Town.

In July 2010, Tuttle was appointed as manager of Hellenic League East Div 1 side Henley Town, where he gained promotion to the Hellenic League Premier Division with a young Henley Town squad in his first season with the club.

In June 2012 he was appointed as manager of Hartley Wintney. But after just a few months at Hartley Wintney was appointed as the new boss at Hellenic League side Newbury. After just a few months at Newbury Tuttle was relieved of his duties on 11 January 2013.

On 23 November 2015, Tuttle was announced as manager of Southern League Division One South & West side Burnham. On 22 August 2016, it was announced that he had parted company with Burnham, after a run of four straight defeats at the start of the Hellenic League season. He was appointed manager of AFC Aldermaston in October 2019.

References

External links

1972 births
Living people
Sportspeople from Reading, Berkshire
English footballers
Association football central defenders
Tottenham Hotspur F.C. players
Peterborough United F.C. players
Sheffield United F.C. players
Crystal Palace F.C. players
Charlton Athletic F.C. players
Barnsley F.C. players
Millwall F.C. players
Wycombe Wanderers F.C. players
Dorking F.C. players
Premier League players
English football managers
Millwall F.C. managers
Swindon Town F.C. non-playing staff
Milton Keynes Dons F.C. non-playing staff
Bracknell Town F.C. managers
Henley Town F.C. managers
Hartley Wintney F.C. managers
Newbury F.C. managers
Burnham F.C. managers
A.F.C. Aldermaston managers
Association football scouts
Footballers from Berkshire